Metathrinca intacta is a moth in the family Xyloryctidae. It was described by Edward Meyrick in 1938. It is found in Yunnan, China.

References

"Metathrinca intacta". Animal Diversity Web. Retrieved September 7, 2020.

Metathrinca
Moths described in 1938